Halle Flat is a relatively flat area just southward of Coxcomb Peak in the Allan Hills of Victoria Land, Antarctica. It was reconnoitered by the New Zealand Antarctic Research Program Allan Hills Expedition, 1964. They gave the name after Thore G. Halle whose pioneering work in 1913 on Antarctic fossil plants forms part of the scientific reports on Otto Nordenskiöld's Swedish Antarctic Expedition of 1901–04.

References

Plains of Antarctica
Landforms of Oates Land